Willstown (sometimes Wattstown, or Titsohili, as it sounded in Cherokee) was an important Cherokee town of the late 18th and early 19th century, located in the southwesternmost part of the Cherokee Nation, in what is now DeKalb County, Alabama. It was near Lookout or Little Wills Creek.

Willstown was one of the trading centers along the Native American trading path in the region. The town site overlapped the boundaries of present-day DeKalb and Etowah counties in Alabama. 

It was largely abandoned after the Cherokee were forcibly removed from the region by United States forces in the 1830s. The city of Ft. Payne, Alabama developed nearby around the fort of the same name, built to intern the Cherokee before their removal.

The town 
Willstown was settled at the southernmost perimeter of Lookout Mountain near the banks of Lookout or Little Wills Creek. Willstown was bordered on the northwest by an ancient Indian trade path or trail. It was in the southwesternmost part of the original Cherokee Nation (in present-day DeKalb and Etowah counties of Alabama) prior to the Indian removal of 1836. Visible remnants of earthwork mounds are at this site. 

It was commonly called "Willstown" after its headman, Will Weber (also known as "RedHead Chief Will"), who was known for his mane of thick red hair. He was Cherokee and European American in ancestry, but was raised as Cherokee. The town had sometimes also been called Wattstown, because John Watts, a Cherokee leader of the group known as Chickamauga, had used it as his headquarters during the Cherokee–American wars. This town served as the council seat of the Lower Cherokee well into the 19th century. Weber emigrated with other Cherokee to the Arkansas country in 1796, evading the 1830s removal. Watts died in 1802.

Willstown was one of the major Cherokee trade centers along the trade path. The trail ran through what is now Attalla, Alabama, and continued north along the edge of the mountains through what is now Reece City, Crudup, Keener, Collinsville, Killian, and Fort Payne into Valley Head and the old mining settlement of Battelle. 

There are three known Indian trading sites along the stretch between Attalla and Collinsville, as well as numerous burial sites, home sites, and remnants of farms. Since the 1920s, the current route of US Highway Eleven has largely followed that of the trading path. The right-of-way of the Great Southern Railroad was constructed along the lowlands by the creek and through the former town site of Willstown. 

The present-day city of Ft. Payne, Alabama, developed south of Willstown and close to the Valley Head area. This city developed at the site of an Army fort of the same name, which was built to intern Cherokee people rounded up in the region prior to their removal to Indian Territory on what became known as the Trail of Tears. Five forts were built in Alabama for the removal.

DeKalb County has installed historical markers at the former sites of the Willstown mission school and of Fort Payne. It also is marking the route through the county as far as Guntersville, Alabama of an independent group led by chief John Benge (Cherokee) on the Trail of Tears. Other groups had guides appointed by the military. Benge departed with 1,103 Cherokee on October 3, 1838. According to county documentation, they traveled along the route of "what is now Alabama Highway 35 through Fort Payne, to the top of Sand Mountain and on to Rainsville. This path lead them along what is now Alabama Highway 75 to Albertville, then on to Highway 431 to Gunters Landing, now Guntersville."

Notes

References
The journal of Major John Norton; Klink, Karl, and James Talman, ed.; Toronto Champlain Society; 1970.
McLoughlin, William G. Cherokee Renascence in the New Republic. (Princeton: Princeton University Press, 1992).
Mooney, James. Myths of the Cherokee and Sacred Formulas of the Cherokee. (Nashville: Charles and Randy Elder-Booksellers, 1982).
Wilkins, Thurman. Cherokee Tragedy: The Ridge Family and the Decimation of a People. (New York: Macmillan Company, 1970).

Cherokee towns
Geography of DeKalb County, Alabama
History of Alabama
Cherokee Nation (1794–1907)